Imagine TV was a Hindi general entertainment channel owned by Turner Broadcasting System, and based in New Delhi.

The channel was known for shows such as Ramayan (2008), Chandragupta Maurya, Swayamvar, Baba Aiso Varr Dhoondo, Meethi Chhori No 1, Jyoti, Do Hanson Ka Jodaa, Pati Patni Aur Woh, Junoon, Pardes Mein Mila Koi Apna, Haar Jeet, Seeta Aur Geeta, Jasuben Jayantilaal Joshi Ki Joint Family, Knights & Angels, Oye! It's Friday!, Nachle Ve with Saroj Khan, Rehna Hai Teri Palkon Ki Chhaon Mein, Angrezi Mein Kehte Hain, Rakt Sambandh, Main Teri Parchhain Hoon, Dil Jeetegi Desi Girl, Gunahon Ka Devta, Sawaare Sabke Sapne Preeto, Shaadi 3 Crore Ki, Radhaa Ki Betiyaan Kuch Kar Dikhayengi, Mata Ki Chowki, Meera and Looteri Dulhan.

History

Launch
The channel was established by NDTV Group under the stewardship of former STAR India CEO Sameer Nair. The channel was launched in India on 21 January 2008 as NDTV Imagine. Imagine TV tied up with Karan Johar, the creative consultant and ambassador of the Imagine TV brand. The channel was originally launched by NDTV in partnership with NBCUniversal but NBCUniversal left the partnership in October 2009.

In December 2009, online and mobile video service NyooTV agreed a deal with NDTV Imagine to distribute ongoing and past TV shows on the platform.

Sale to Turner
On 8 December 2009, it was announced that Turner Asia Pacific Ventures (a wholly owned subsidiary of Turner Broadcasting System) had acquired a 92% stake in NDTV Imagine Ltd. NDTV's 76 percent stake in NDTV Imagine would be given to Turner for $67 million, and the Time Warner company would acquire fresh equity worth $50 million to get 92% control. NDTV Imagine Ltd. ran NDTV Imagine, NDTV Lumiere and NDTV Imagine Showbiz television channels and film production transfer of shares, amounting to 85.68% of NDTV Imagine Ltd, by NDTV Networks Plc to Turner Asia Pacific Ventures. The three channels will be under Turner General Entertainment Networks, a holding company that will infuse fresh capital to fund the network's growth. The 'NDTV' brand was dropped and the channels were relabelled Imagine TV, Lumiere Movies and Imagine Showbiz. Imagine Showbiz was sold in January 2011 to Reliance Broadcast Network.

Shutdown

On 12 April 2012, it was announced that Imagine TV would close, as the channel struggled for ratings amidst competition from rival Hindi entertainment channels, where it was even beaten by the newly launched Life OK. The channel faced the same fate for its sister channel Real.
Although all of its business operations will close with immediate effect, the channel will continue to air reruns from 13 April, until official obligations ended and it could cease transmissions completely.

Imagine TV shut down on 11 May 2012 at midnight in India. As of 12 May 2012, the channel has been removed successfully from all operators. Imagine TV's website was also closed and all episodes and promos were deleted from its YouTube channel.

In the Middle East Imagine closed on 30 May 2012, when the channel was replaced by Imagine Movies. The UK and Irish feed of Imagine Dil Se closed on 6 July 2012. The channel's Sky EPG slot was purchased by Viacom 18 to launch Rishtey, a free-to-air sister channel for Colors TV.

International availability
In the UK and Ireland, Imagine TV is broadcast on the Sky platform, where it is free-to-air. Due to copyright issues, the channel was unable to use 'Imagine TV' in the region, therefore it was rebranded as Imagine Dil Se, from NDTV Imagine, on 1 November 2010. The feed proved to be a success, beating Star Plus in the UK ratings to become the most watched Asian channel.

From 4 February 2009 Imagine was available in the US on the Dish Network platform. Imagine was also available free-to-air on Nilesat in the Middle East. In November 2009, NDTV Imagine launched in Canada in partnership with Canadian broadcaster Ethnic Channels Group and is available on Bell Satellite TV. The channel was rebranded as Imagine Dil Se in early 2011. The channel was also aired in parts of Asia Pacific viz- Fiji, Australia, Japan, Malaysia, apart from Nepal and Bangladesh.

Programming

References

External links 
 Official website at the Internet Archive

Television channels and stations established in 2008
Television channels and stations disestablished in 2012
British Indian mass media
Television stations in Mumbai
Defunct television channels in India
2008 establishments in Maharashtra
2012 disestablishments in India
Warner Bros. Discovery Asia-Pacific